Stewart is a Scottish surname derived from the Gaelic Stiùbhart meaning steward. Alternative spellings are Stuart, Steward and Steuart. The surname Stewart has large concentrations in the United States (mainly in the Deep South, and the other southern states), United Kingdom (mainly in Scotland, Northern Ireland, North East England, South West England, Cumbria, Lancashire, and Yorkshire), Canada, Jamaica, New Zealand, Australia and elsewhere that has large Scottish or Ulster Scots diaspora.

The progenitor of the Stewart family was Alan fitz Flaad, a Breton knight who settled in England after the Norman Conquest. His son, Walter fitz Alan, relocated to Scotland during the Anarchy and became the High Steward of Scotland, hence the origin of the surname. In 2014, Stewart was the 66th-most common surname in the United Kingdom.

House of Stewart

One of the hereditary Stewart stewards, Walter Stewart, married Marjorie Bruce, daughter of King Robert I, and founded the royal House of Stewart, beginning with their son King Robert II. The House of Stewart was the longest serving royal dynasty of Scotland. Mary, Queen of Scots formalised the use of the spelling Stuart, while resident in France, in order to preserve the correct pronunciation. In 1603, the Stewart King James VI of Scotland became King James I of England and Wales by his succession to Queen Elizabeth I. The Stewart dynasty ruled Scotland, England and Wales (with an interruption during Cromwell's Commonwealth after the English Civil War) until 1714, when Queen Anne died and the British Crown passed to the German Electors of Hanover.

The grandson of James II, Prince Charles Edward Stuart, led the last attempt to restore the Stewart dynasty to the British Crown in 1745-6 and became known to history as "Bonnie Prince Charlie". This attempted coup d'état ended in the slaughter of Charles' army at the Battle of Culloden in April, 1746.

Stewart peers
In addition to the Royal House of Stuart, various branches of the Stewart family became Scottish peers, at various times holding the Marquisate of Bute, the earldoms of Atholl, Mar, Moray, Angus, Galloway, as well as several Lordships of Parliament. Several families of Stewarts became Highland clans in their own right, including the Stewarts of Appin, the Stewarts of Ardvorlich, the Stewarts of Atholl and the Stewarts of Garth.

Diaspora
Many Stewart emigrants from the lowlands of Scotland settled in the Irish province of Ulster in the seventeenth century.  Stewarts also emigrated from other parts of Scotland and settled throughout the rest of Ireland.

People named Stewart

Surname
 Adam Stewart (disambiguation), several people
 Al Stewart (born 1945), Scottish singer-songwriter
 Alana Stewart (born 1945), American actress, former wife of Rod Stewart
 Alastair Stewart (born 1952), British journalist and broadcaster
 Alec Stewart (born 1963), former England wicket-keeper
 Alexander P. Stewart (1821–1908), American general and professor
 Alexander William Stewart (1865-1933), Scottish naval architect, engineer and inventor
 Alexis Stewart (born 1965), American talk radio host, daughter of Martha Stewart
 Alice Stewart (1906–2002), British physician and epidemiologist
 Alison Stewart (born 1966), American journalist
 Andy Stewart (disambiguation), several people
 Anthony Stewart (disambiguation), several people
 April Stewart (born 1969), American actress
 ArDarius Stewart (born 1993), American football player
 Bain Stewart, Australian film producer, husband of Leah Purcell
 Belle Stewart (1906–1997), Scottish singer
 William Stewart (disambiguation), several people, includes Bill Stewart
 Bob Stewart (disambiguation), several people
 Booboo Stewart (born 1994), American singer of T-Squad and actor
 Breanna Stewart (born 1994), American basketball player
 Brent Stewart, Manitoba judge
 Brett Stewart (disambiguation), several people
 Brian Stewart (disambiguation), several people
 Brock Stewart (born 1991), American baseball player
 Bryan Stewart (born 1985), English footballer
 Bryanne Stewart (born 1979), Australian tennis player
 Calum Stewart (born 1982), Scottish musician
 Catherine Mary Stewart, Canadian actress
 Charles Stewart (disambiguation), several people
 Corbet Page Stewart (1896–1962), Scottish biochemist
 Corey Stewart (disambiguation), several people
 Crystle Stewart, Miss USA 2008
 Daniel Stewart (disambiguation), several people
 Darrell Stewart (American football) (born 1996), American football player
 David Stewart (disambiguation), several people
 Dennis Stewart (disambiguation), several people
 Derek Stewart (footballer) (born 1948), Scottish footballer
 DJ Stewart (born 1993), American baseball player
 Donald Stewart (disambiguation), several people
 Dugald Stewart (1753–1828), Scottish philosopher
 Duncan Stewart (disambiguation), several people
 Earnie Stewart (born 1969), Dutch-born American soccer player
 Ed Stewart (1941–2016), British broadcaster
 Ed Stewart (American football) (born 1972), American football player
 Edwin C. Stewart (1864–1921), New York politician
 E. J. Stewart (1877–1929), American college sports coach
 Elinore Pruitt Stewart (1876–1933), American homesteader in Wyoming and memoirist
 Evan Stewart (disambiguation), several people
 G. Fowler Stewart (1861–1917), businessman in South Australia
 Frederick Stewart (disambiguation), several people
 Gary Stewart (singer) (1944–2003), American country rock musician
 Gay Stewart, American physicist
 George Stewart (disambiguation), several people
 Gershom Stewart (1857–1929), British businessman in China, Conservative MP
 Glenn Stewart (born 1984), Australian Rugby League player
 Grace Campbell Stewart (died 1863), British painter
 Grover Stewart (born 1993), American football player
 Haldane Stewart (1868–1942), English musician and cricketer
 Harriet Bradford Tiffany Stewart (1798–1830), American missionary
 Harry Stewart (1908–1956), American comedian
 Helen Stewart (disambiguation), several people
 Henry Stewart (disambiguation), several people
 Homer Joseph Stewart (1915–2007), American aeronautical engineer
 Iain Stewart (disambiguation), several people
 Ian Stewart (disambiguation), several people
 Isaiah Stewart (born 2001), American basketball player
 Ivan Stewart, American racing driver
 Jackie Stewart (born 1939), Scottish Formula One driver
 James Stewart (disambiguation), several people
 Jane Agnes Stewart (1860-1944), American author, editor
 Janet Cumbrae Stewart (1883-1960), Australian painter
 Jean Stewart (disambiguation), several people
 Jermaine Stewart (1957–1997), American R&B and pop singer
 J. I. M. Stewart (1906–1994), Scottish novelist writing as Michael Innes
 Joffre Stewart (1925–2019), American poet, anarchist and pacifist
 John Stewart (disambiguation), several people
 Jon Stewart (born 1962), American political satirist
 Josh Stewart (disambiguation), several people
 Julius LeBlanc Stewart (1855–1919), American artist
 Kaleb Stewart (1975–2021), American musician
 Karen Weldin Stewart, Insurance Commissioner of Delaware
 Kevin Stewart (footballer) (born 1993), English football player
 Kordell Stewart (born 1972), American football player
 Kristen Stewart (born 1990), American actress
 LeConte Stewart (1891–1990), American artist 
 Lizbeth Stewart (1948–2013), American ceramist
 Lynne Stewart (1939–2017), American lawyer and criminal
 M. J. Stewart (born 1995), American football player
 Malcolm Stewart (disambiguation), several people
 Martha Stewart (born 1941), American businesswoman, writer and television personality
 Marvin Stewart (1912–2009), American football player
 Marvin Stewart (basketball), American basketball player
 Mary Stuart (disambiguation), several people
 Matthew Stewart (disambiguation), several people
 Michael Stewart (disambiguation), several people
 Monica Faith Stewart (born 1952), American politician
 Nellie Stewart (1858–1931), Australian stage actress
 Oliver W. Stewart (1867–1937), American politician
 Patrick Stewart (disambiguation), several people
 Paul Stewart (disambiguation), several people
 Payne Stewart (1957–1999), American golfer
 Perez M. Stewart (1858–1924), New York politician
 Potter Stewart (1915–1985), US Supreme Court justice
 Richard Stewart (born 1959) mayor of Coquitlam, British Columbia
 Richard Stewart (theatre) (1827–1902), Australian stage actor
 Robert Stewart (disambiguation), several people
 Rod Stewart (born 1945), British singer
 Rosemary Stewart (business theorist) (1924–2015), British researcher and writer in business management
 Roy Mackenzie Stewart (1889–1964), British neurologist
 Scott Stewart (disambiguation), several people
 Thomas Stewart (disambiguation), several people
 Tony Stewart (disambiguation), several people
 Trenton Lee Stewart, American writer
 Walter Stewart (disambiguation), several people
 William Stewart (disambiguation), several people
 Wyatt A. Stewart, American businessman and career political fundraiser
 Wynn Stewart (1934–1985), American country music singer-songwriter and musician
 American family members of Sly and the Family Stone:
 Sylvester Stewart (Sly Stone) (born 1944), singer-songwriter, frontman
 Rose Stewart (Rose Stone) (born 1945), singer/keyboardist
 Fred Stewart (Freddie Stone) (born 1946), singer/guitarist
 Vaetta Stewart (Vet Stone) (born 1949), singer

Given name
Stewart Copeland, American drummer, best known as the drummer in The Police
Stewart Granger, English-American actor, born James Stewart
Stewart Lee, English stand-up comedian, writer, director and musician
Stewart Mills, Australian Rugby League player
Stewart Stevenson, SNP Member of the Scottish Parliament for Banffshire & Buchan Coast, and Minister for Transport, Infrastructure and Climate Change

Fictional characters
John Stewart, a DC Comics character, one of the Green Lanterns
Stewart, a character in the 1987 American comedy movie Revenge of the Nerds II: Nerds in Paradise
Stewart Stevenson, a character in Beavis and Butt-Head

See also
Stuart (name)
Steuart (disambiguation)
Steward (surname)

References

English masculine given names
English-language surnames
Occupational surnames
Scottish surnames
Scottish given names
Scottish masculine given names